Wyoming Highway 235 (WYO 235) is a  Wyoming state road located in northeastern Lincoln County, Wyoming with a small,  section in extreme southern Sublette County, Wyoming.

Route description
Wyoming Highway 235 begins its southeastern end at U.S. Route 189 (Main Street) in La Barge. From there, Highway 235 travels northwesterly from La Barge toward the community of Calpet as it primarily serves the oil refineries in the area. WYO 235 crosses into Sublette County at approximately 3.89 miles as it reaches the community of Calpet. At 4.49 miles WYO 235 ends as Sublette CR 134 takes over heading north.

Major intersections

References

External links 

Wyoming State Routes
WYO 235 - US 189 to Sublette CR 134

Transportation in Lincoln County, Wyoming
Transportation in Sublette County, Wyoming
235